Troy Moss Smith (born June 29, 1965) is an American politician and businessman serving as a member of the Mississippi House of Representatives from the 84th district. He assumed office on January 7, 2020.

Education 
Smith graduated from Quitman High School in Quitman, Mississippi and attended Jones County Junior College.

Career 
Outside of politics, Smith owns Long's Fish Camp, a seafood restaurant in Enterprise, Clarke County, Mississippi. He also represented the third district on the Clark County Board of Supervisors. He was elected to the  Mississippi House of Representatives in January 2020.

References 

1965 births
People from Quitman, Mississippi
People from Clarke County, Mississippi
Republican Party members of the Mississippi House of Representatives
Living people